is a residential neighborhood located in western Ōta in southern Tokyo, Japan. It is known as one of the most exclusive neighborhoods in Tokyo.

History
Den-en-chōfu was built based on the "Garden City" idea originally developed by the British city planner Ebenezer Howard.

Den-en-chōfu was planned as a garden suburb of Tokyo. In the early 1900s, financier Eiichi Shibusawa bought, named, and developed the area by emulating the garden suburbs that were growing in metropolitan areas around the world, particularly those in Greater London.

Although the area was developing at an adequate pace, it was the Great Kantō Earthquake of 1923 that guaranteed his success. Central Tokyo was leveled in the earthquake, but Den-en-chōfu was virtually untouched; in the aftermath, there was an exodus of people from the central city to the suburbs.

Modern times
Den-en-chōfu is one of the most famous and exclusive neighborhoods where many business executives and celebrities reside. Being 10 km away from the center of Tokyo, the area contains natural parks. The area has its own regulations for construction in order to preserve the town feel to the area. The residences are fairly big compared to normal housing in other areas in Japan, and the district is often compared to Beverly Hills, Los Angeles.
Den-en-chōfu's success has influenced neighboring areas along Tōkyū railway lines in western Meguro, including the Yakumo, Kakinokizaka, Nakane, Okusawa and Jiyūgaoka neighbourhoods.

Den-en-chōfu is known as a very expensive area, with houses that are large by Tokyo standards.

Education

Ōta Ward operates the public elementary and junior high schools in Den-en-chōfu.

Most of Den-en-Chofu is zoned to Den-en-chōfu Elementary School (田園調布小学校) while parts of 1-chome are zoned to Chofu Ōtsuka Elementary School (調布大塚小学校).

Most of Den-en-Chofu is zoned to Den-en-chōfu Junior High School (田園調布中学校), while a part of 1-chome 1-ban is zoned to Ishikawadai Junior High School (石川台中学校).

The Tokyo Metropolitan Government Board of Education operates Den-en-chōfu High School.

Residents

Well-known residents of the area include:
 Ayumi Hamasaki, singer
 Hiroshi Itsuki, singer
 Katsuya Nomura, baseball player/manager
 Kiichi Nakai, actor
 Max Matsuura, recording executive
 Shigeo Nagashima, baseball player/manager
 Shintaro Ishihara, former governor of Tokyo
 Yoshinori Kobayashi, manga artist
 Yukio Hatoyama, former Prime Minister

References

Notes

Further reading

  - PDF file - English abstract included

Populated places established in the 1900s
1900s establishments in Japan
Districts of Ōta, Tokyo
Garden suburbs